The El Ayyat train disaster happened at 02:00 on the morning of 20 February 2002 in an eleven-carriage passenger train travelling from Cairo to Luxor. A cooking gas cylinder exploded in the fifth carriage, creating a fire which destroyed seven third-class carriages. The initial number of dead given by officials at the time was 383, all Egyptians. However, considering that seven carriages were burnt to the ground, and each carriage was packed with at least double the maximum carrying capacity of 150, this number may be greatly underestimated. The dubious nature of the given death toll lies with the absence of a full passenger list; accounting for those missing was almost impossible at the time. In addition, the fire was so intense and the carriages so badly burned that many corpses had been reduced to ash. As there was no means of communication between the driver and the rear carriages, the driver did not immediately know of the fire, resulting in many people attempting to flee from the overcrowded carriages, jumping to their death. Some important Egyptians have commented that the official number of 383 dead is grossly inaccurate and was an attempt to lessen the damage done to the reputation of the government.

See also 
 List of rail accidents in Egypt
 Egyptian National Railways

External links 
 Horror on Egypt fire train (CNN.com)

El Ayyat railway accident 
El Ayyat railway accident 
Fires in Egypt
Train and rapid transit fires
Railway accidents and incidents in Egypt
El Ayyat railway accident 
El Ayyat railway accident 
El Ayyat railway accident 
Giza Governorate